Beware the Slenderman (stylized as _beware the slenderman) is a 2016 American documentary film directed by Irene Taylor Brodsky about the Slender Man stabbing. It premiered at South by Southwest in March 2016 and was broadcast on HBO on January 23, 2017.

Synopsis
Beware the Slenderman discusses the incident in which two girls attempted to murder one of their friends in an attempt to appease Slender Man, a fictional monster who originated from an Internet phenomenon called "creepypasta". The documentary was shot over eighteen months and contains interviews with the families of the two would-be murderers.

The film makes use of various YouTube videos to do with Slender Man, in particular footage from Marble Hornets and Tribe Twelve. It also makes use of footage from the games Slender: The Eight Pages and Minecraft.

References

External links
 Beware the Slenderman on HBO
 
 

2016 documentary films
2016 films
Documentary films about crime in the United States
HBO documentary films
Slender Man
American documentary films
2010s English-language films
2010s American films